The Silencers is a 1962 Matt Helm spy novel by Donald Hamilton.

The Silencers may also refer to:

 The Silencers (band), a Scottish pop/rock band
 The Silencers (comics)
 The Silencers (film), the 1966 film based upon the novel and starring Dean Martin
 The Silencers (ska band), an American ska punk band

See also
 The Silencer
 Silencer (disambiguation)